"Tender Moment" is a song co-written and recorded by American country music singer Lee Roy Parnell.  It was released in 1992 as the fourth single from his album Love Without Mercy.  The song spent 20 weeks on the Hot Country Songs charts, peaking at number two in 1993. The album's first single, "The Rock", was the b-side.  The song was written by Parnell, Rory Bourke and Cris Moore.

Music video
The music video was directed by Michael Merriman and premiered in early 1993.

Chart performance
"Tender Moment" debuted at number 59 on the U.S. Billboard Hot Country Singles & Tracks for the week of March 6, 1993.

Year-end charts

References

1993 singles
Lee Roy Parnell songs
Songs written by Rory Bourke
Song recordings produced by Barry Beckett
Song recordings produced by Scott Hendricks
Arista Nashville singles
Songs written by Lee Roy Parnell
1992 songs